Patricia A. Lockwood is an American politician.

Background
Lockwood went to the University of Detroit Mercy.

Political career
In the 1970s, Lockwood move to Fenton just before Fenton leveled the downtown buildings. From 1987 to 1988, Lockwood was on Fenton City Council.  Lockwood served as Fenton, Michigan's Mayor from 1989 to 1998. From 1998 to 2002, Lockwood served the Michigan 51st District as Representatives, as a Democrat. She then served as a State Transportation Commission Advisor.  On March 18, 2004, she was appointed by Governor Jennifer Granholm to the position of Emerald Ash Borer (EAB) Policy Director. In 2006, she ran for Genesee County County Commissioner for the 6th District and won.  She defeated Joseph Graves in 2008 to retain her seat on the County Board of Commissioners. Granholm appointed her acting Michigan Racing Commissioner until the office was abolished on October 17, 2010.  Lockwood decided not to run for re-election for the County Commissioner, 6th District in 2010. She was elected back to the Fenton City Council on November 8, 2011.

References

Living people
Year of birth missing (living people)
University of Detroit Mercy alumni
Democratic Party members of the Michigan House of Representatives
Women state legislators in Michigan
Michigan city council members
Mayors of places in Michigan
County commissioners in Michigan
Women city councillors in Michigan
20th-century American politicians
21st-century American politicians
20th-century American women politicians
21st-century American women politicians
Women mayors of places in Michigan